Gedikli is a village in the Gölbaşı District, Adıyaman Province, Turkey. The village is populated by Kurds of the Hevêdan tribe and had a population of 595 in 2021.

References

Villages in Gölbaşı District, Adıyaman Province

Kurdish settlements in Adıyaman Province